Hunter House Museum may refer to:

In Scotland
Hunter House Museum, East Kilbride, South Lanarkshire

In the United States
Hunter House Museum, Sudbury, Pennsylvania, at Fort Augusta
Hunter House Victorian Museum, Norfolk, Virginia

See also 
 Hunter House (disambiguation)